Sir Charles Antony St John Gray (6 July 1942 – 3 March 2022) was a British barrister and judge, who specialised in intellectual property, copyright, privacy and defamation cases. As a judge, he presided over the trial of David Irving's libel lawsuit against Professor Deborah Lipstadt and Penguin Books over claims that Irving was a Holocaust denier; Gray delivered a 349 pages long judgment against Irving.

Biography
Gray attended Trinity College, Oxford, earning a bachelor's degree in 1961.  He was called to the bar by Lincoln's Inn and began his practice in 1967. Cases he tried include Crossman Diaries, Saatchi v Saatchi & Saatchi, Elton John v MGN, Aldington v Tolstoy, Aitken v Granada and Guardian. He took silk in 1984 and was elected a bencher in 1993.

Gray retired in 2008 although occasionally presided over the Queen's Bench until 2011. He served as an adjudicator in lawsuits against News Group Newspapers brought by people whose phones were hacked by the group. He was a Commissioner in the High Court of Jersey.

Gray was knighted by the Queen in December 1998. He died on 3 March 2022, at the age of 79.

He was portrayed by actor Alex Jennings in Denial, the 2016 film based on the Irving v Penguin Books Ltd and Lipstadt case.

References 

1942 births
2022 deaths
English barristers
21st-century English judges
Judiciary of Jersey
Alumni of Trinity College, Oxford
Knights Bachelor
21st-century King's Counsel
Queen's Bench Division judges